Salvatore Mannuzzu (7 March 1930 – 10 September 2019) was an Italian writer, politician, and magistrate.

Life
Mannuzzu was born in Pitigliano.  He was a magistrate until 1976 and a member of the Italian Parliament until 1987. He is considered, with Giulio Angioni  and Sergio Atzeni, to have been one of the initiators of the so-called Sardinian Literary Nouvelle Vague, or Sardinian Literary Spring, the Sardinian narrative in Europe, which followed the work of figures such as Grazia Deledda, Emilio Lussu, Giuseppe Dessì, Gavino Ledda, and Salvatore Satta.

Mannuzzu's most successful novel is Procedura (1988. Einaudi), winner of Italy's Viareggio Prize in 1989. It is a detective story where the nameless narrator is an investigative judge who has to discover Valerio Garau's killer. Garau is an attorney from Sassari in Sardinia, who is poisoned to death while having coffee with his lover. The story unfolds over two years, 1978 and 1979, during a critical period for Italy, marked by a wave of terrorism. In 2000 the director Antonello Grimaldi has made the film Un delitto impossibile from this novel, which is also considered (with the coeval L'oro di Fraus by Giulio Angioni), the origin of a genre of Sardinian detective stories (giallo sardo).

Works 
Procedura (novel) 1988
Un morso di formica (novel) 1989
La figlia perduta (short stories) 1992
Le ceneri del Montiferro (novel) 1994 
II terzo suono (novel) 1995
Corpus (poems) 1997
Il catalogo (novel) 2000
Alice (novel) 2001
Le fate dell'inverno (novel) 2004
La ragazza perduta (novel) 2011
Snuff o l'arte di morire (novel) 2013

References 

Viareggio Prize winners
1930 births
2019 deaths
20th-century Italian novelists
20th-century Italian male writers
21st-century Italian novelists
Italian male novelists
21st-century Italian male writers
People from Pitigliano